was a Wii channel that featured a video-on-demand, film rental and shopping service operated by Nintendo and Dentsu.

It was released on 1 May 2009, exclusively in Japan, and it could be downloaded from the Wii Shop Channel for free, although paid videos could be purchased with Wii Points. The service was shut down on 30 April 2012.

Overview
The channel allowed the user to add a family of up to eight Mii characters, which would place them on the Wii Room, a Japanese living room with a tea table and a television. The tea table was what inspired the service, becoming the channel's icon. The characters would do everyday things on the room, like vacuuming, reading manga, eating lunch or playing on their Nintendo DSi. Pointing at different parts of the room with the Wii Remote would take the user to different menus and services. The room would change depending on the season and time of the day.

The service delivered plenty of original shows, also including sponsored content. While there was no specific genre or target audience, the main focus was on programmes that could be watched by the whole family.

The channel could be downloaded for free from the Wii Shop Channel, and it used 121 blocks. It was a Japanese-exclusive channel, so it could only be used on Japanese Wii consoles, and it was only available in Japanese.

Features

Rooms
By accessing the Iron'na Ma (いろんな間, Various Rooms) menu, the user could find a parade of different Miis with logos of services and partners. Selecting one would take the user to the room of that service, allowing them to find more information about it, watch its content or take part in polls.

The rooms were only available for a limited amount of time, and many were themed around seasons such as New Year's Day or Valentine's Day. Some rooms included original content, such as the Pokémon Room, the Kirby Room, Minna no Ma and Mii no Ma. Other rooms featured giveaways or partnered content, like the Warner Room and the Disney Room.

Shows
Wii no Ma also had a dedicated shows section, featuring a list of shows aimed towards the whole family.

Content could be searched by category, genre, gender, blood type, age, ratings or simply the name of the desired programme. A Mii named Osusume (おすすめ, Recommendations) would guide the user to find content they might like. After a video was watched, the registered users could rate it by dragging each their own Mii to the desired rating. The rating ranged from four marks (◎, ○, △, ×, from best to worst).

Theatre
Wii no Ma received its first update on 21 November 2009, the Theatre Update (sometimes referred to as version 770), which added the Theatre Room. This room depicts the Miis eating in a home theatre, with a large screen and blue lights that can be switched to other colours. From this theatre, the user could find paid content and shows or films that could be rented. Some featured shows were Sesame Street, the Pokémon anime and Hoshi no Kirby (which was also available in Europe from the Kirby TV Channel).

Content purchases used Wii Points.

Shopping
On 1 November 2010, Wii no Ma received a new update, the Shopping Update (sometimes referred to as version 1025). It featured a complete renewal, with new menus, a new room, a new opening, and most importantly, the launch of the new Wii no Ma Shopping service.

Through this new service made in collaboration with Senshukai, users could purchase everyday items, food, merchandise, DVD releases of Wii no Ma shows, and special items such as the Mii Stamps. Unlike the Theatre, shop items could be paid for with a credit card, from a convenience store, or on cash on delivery. Orders could also be placed through a phone call for customers who were not comfortable with online shopping.

The new Wii Room was a little smaller than the previous one and featured a large television, but the camera could no longer be rotated. The interface and menus were made easier to access, now all the options were listed on buttons displayed on the screen, rather than needing to point the Wii Remote around the room.

The Shopping Update was the final update to Wii no Ma, although the service's content kept being updated until the shutdown.

Concierge Miis
Concierge Miis were celebrity or original Mii characters who would visit the user's Wii Room. They would introduce themselves and present recommended shows for the user to watch. Since the Shopping Update, concierge Miis could feature voice recordings too. Concierge Mii videos could be watched again at any time from the Shows section.

Messages
Wii no Ma included an option to send and receive messages. Users could send messages within their own Wii Room for another family member to read, or to a Wii Friend through the Wii Mail service provided by WiiConnect24. The messages could have up to four speech bubbles, and they could include a video to recommend. The user would choose which Mii would send the message and which mood to present it with. That Mii would then visit the recipient's Wii Room and present the message, and show the recommended video if included.

Posters
The Wii Room and the Theatre Room featured several posters that would show cycling images of different titles, campaigns, adverts, shows and games, like Wii Sports Resort or Wii Fit. By pointing at them with the Wii Remote, the user could watch a video to obtain more information.

Dokodemo Wii no Ma
Dokodemo Wii no Ma (どこでもWiiの間, Wii Room Anywhere) was a Nintendo DSiWare title intended to be used with Wii no Ma. It was made available on the Japanese Nintendo DSi Shop on 1 May 2009 and shut down on 30 April 2012, same dates as Wii no Ma.

It allowed users to transfer Wii no Ma videos to their Nintendo DSi consoles and watch them on the go. Videos could be stored on the console's memory or an SD card. The system memory only allowed for up to 93 blocks, so an SD card was required for long videos. In addition, the users could obtain "Video Coupons" provided by Wii no Ma partners and bring them to the shops to receive various special offers.

Reception
Despite being short-lived and exclusive to Japan, Wii no Ma was a success. By 26 October 2009, the service had already been used by 2.48 million people in 930,000 homes. As of February 2012, the channel was downloaded 4.49 million times and had 8.81 million users.

Shutdown
On 21 February 2012, Nintendo posted a notice announcing that Wii no Ma would be discontinued, only three years after its launch. On 3 March, a room Arigatou no Ma (ありがとうの間, Thank You Room) was added to the parade. On 28 April 2012, a goodbye thank-you message from the staff was shown on the room's television.

Wii no Ma was discontinued on 30 April 2012. The Wii no Ma company then became Nintendo Network Service Database, until it was liquidated in 2018.

In 2020, a group of Wii homebrew developers started a project to make a custom replacement server for Wii no Ma and other Japanese-exclusive Wii channels in an attempt to preserve them and make them accessible after the shutdown, as well as to localise them from Japanese to English and other languages. On 18 October 2020, the first beta release for the Wii no Ma revival was complete under a service named WiiLink.

See also
Wii Menu
WiiConnect24
Everybody Votes Channel
Mii Contest Channel
Satellaview
 List of streaming services for the Nintendo Wii

Notes

References

External links
Wii no Ma on the official Wii Channels site
Iwata Asks: Wii no Ma (Japanese)
Iwata Asks: Wii no Ma (English translation)

Wii
Dentsu
2009 establishments in Japan
2012 disestablishments in Japan
Products and services discontinued in 2012